Moechotypa semenovi is a species of beetle in the family Cerambycidae. It was described by Heyrovský in 1934. It is known from China.

References

semenovi
Beetles described in 1934